Arles–Kilcruise GAA Gaelic Athletic Association Club is a gaelic football club in County Laois, Republic of Ireland.

Founded in October 1960, the club colours are maroon and white.

The club won its only Laois Senior Football Championship title to date in 2003 under the captaincy of Paudge Conway.

Arles won the Laois Junior Football Championship in 202 and followed up with the intermediate title two years later.

From Under 12 to Under 21 the club's players play with Na Fianna Óg

Achievements
 Laois Senior Football Championships: (1) 2003
 Laois All-County Football League Div 1: (2) 2002, 2003
 Laois Intermediate Football Championships: (2) 1967, 1999
 Laois Junior Football Championships: (1) 1965

Notable players
Chris Conway
 David Conway 
John Conway
Kevin Meaney
Ross Munnelly

References

External links
Times article
Official Arles/Kilcruise GAA Club website

Gaelic games clubs in County Laois
Gaelic football clubs in County Laois